Prantij is one of the 182 Legislative Assembly constituencies of Gujarat state in India. It is part of Sabarkantha district.

List of segments
This assembly seat represents the following segments,

 Prantij Taluka
 Talod Taluka – Entire taluka except village – Charanvanta

Members of Legislative Assembly
2007 - Jay Chauhan, Bharatiya Janata Party
2012 - Mahendrasinh Baraiya, Indian National Congress

Election results

2022

2017

2012

References

External links
 

Assembly constituencies of Gujarat
Sabarkantha district